The Bushwhackers is a 1952 American Western film directed by Rod Amateau and starring John Ireland, Wayne Morris, Lawrence Tierney, Dorothy Malone, Lon Chaney Jr. And Myrna Dell.

Plot
Tired of killing, war veteran Jefferson Waring rides west, but in Missouri he sees "squatters" mowed down by men working for rich, ruthless Artemus Taylor.

He spends the night at Independence newspaperman Peter Sharpe's place, but is jailed when daughter Cathy Sharpe finds this total stranger in her room. The local marshal, John Harding, is just one of many men on Taylor's payroll.

Peter's business is threatened by banker Stone unless he takes Taylor's side against "squatters" settling in the region. The blind and wheelchair-using Taylor and ambitious daughter Norah are secretly aware that railroad surveyors are considering laying tracks nearby, so they want all the land for themselves.

Jeff decides to leave. Norah and henchman Ding Bell intercept him; Norah shoots at him but misses. They take him to see Artemus, who tells a vocally reluctant Bell to take Jeff off to a remote canyon and murder him. Under Norah's instructions, Artemus's chief thug Sam Tobin goes after them to murder both; he wounds Jeff and kills Bell, but not before Bell hits him with a fatal shot. A doctor treats Jeff's wounds but Marshall Harding turns up and charges Jeff with the two killings.

When the situation escalates and two of Taylor's thugs gun down Peter Sharpe, Jeff breaks out of jail and organizes a group of settlers to resist Taylor's planned big attack. The settlers slaughter Taylor's thugs; Taylor dies of a heart attack; Norah, having shot and she thinks killed banker Justin Stone in order to get some getaway money, is killed by him as she leaves. Jeff stays in town to run the paper with Cathy.

Cast
 John Ireland as Jefferson Waring
 Wayne Morris as Marshal John Harding
 Lawrence Tierney as Sam Tobin
 Dorothy Malone as Cathy Sharpe
 Lon Chaney Jr. as Artemus Taylor (as Lon Chaney)
 Myrna Dell as Norah Taylor
 Frank Marlowe as Peter Sharpe
 William Holmes as "Ding" Bell (as Bill Holmes)
 Jack Elam as Cree
 Ward Wood as Second Henchman (as Bob Wood)
 Charles Trowbridge as Justin Stone
 Norman Leavitt as Deputy Yale
 Stuart Randall as Slocum 
 George Lynn as Guthrie 
 Gordon Wynn as John Quigley (as Gordon Wynne)
 Gabriel Conrad as Kramer
 Eddie Parks as Funeral Franklin
 Bob Broder as Tommy Lloyd

External links

1952 films
1950s English-language films
American black-and-white films
1952 Western (genre) films
Films directed by Rod Amateau
Films set in Missouri
American Western (genre) films
Jack Broder Productions Inc. films
Films scored by Albert Glasser
1952 directorial debut films
Squatting in film
1950s American films